The 2007 Dartford Borough Council election to the Dartford Borough Council was held on 3 May 2007.  The whole council was up for election and the Conservative Party took overall control of the council.

Election result

|}

Ward results

External links
Dartford Council Results

2007 English local elections
2007
2000s in Kent